Paul Joseph Boyle,  (born 16 November 1964) is a British geographer, academic, and academic administrator. He was the Vice-Chancellor of the University of Leicester between 2014 and 2019. He had been Professor of Human Geography at the University of St Andrews from 1999 to 2014, and Chief Executive of the Economic and Social Research Council (ESRC) from 2010 to 2014. He took over as Vice-Chancellor of Swansea University at the end of the 2018/2019 academic year.

Honours
In 2006, Boyle was elected a Fellow of the Royal Society of Edinburgh (FRSE). In 2013, he was elected a Fellow of the British Academy (FBA), the United Kingdom's national academy for the social sciences and humanities. In the 2016 New Year Honours, he was appointed a Commander of the Order of the British Empire (CBE) "for services to social science".

Selected works

References

 

 
 
 
 
 
 

1964 births
Living people
British geographers
Human geographers
Academics of the University of Leicester
Academics of the University of St Andrews
Fellows of the British Academy
Commanders of the Order of the British Empire
Fellows of the Royal Society of Edinburgh
Academics of Swansea University